Maroantsetra superba is a species of beetle in the family Buprestidae, the only species in the genus Maroantsetra.

References

Buprestidae